Ectemnius cephalotes is a species of square-headed wasps in the family Crabronidae. It is found in Europe and Northern Asia (excluding China) as well as North America.

References

Further reading

External links

 NCBI Taxonomy Browser, Ectemnius cephalotes

Crabronidae
Insects described in 1792